Carlsbergite is a nitride mineral that has the chemical formula CrN, or chromium nitride.

It is named after the Carlsberg Foundation which backed the recovery of the Agpalilik fragment of the Cape York meteorite in which the mineral was first described.

It occurs in meteorites along the grain boundaries of kamacite (nickel-rich native iron) or troilite (FeS: iron sulfide) in the form of tiny plates. It occurs associated with kamacite, taenite, daubreelite, troilite and sphalerite, .

In addition to the Cape York meteorite, carlsbergite has been reported from:
 the North Chile meteorite in the Antofagasta Province, Chile
 the Nentmannsdorf meteorite of Bahretal, Erzgebirge, Saxony
 the Okinawa Trough, Senkaku Islands, Okinawa Prefecture, Japan
 the Uwet meteorite of Cross River State, Nigeria
 the Sikhote-Alin meteorite, Sikhote-Alin Mountains, Russia
 the Hex River Mountains meteorite from the Cape Winelands District, Western Cape Province, South Africa
 the Canyon Diablo meteorite of Meteor Crater, Coconino County, Arizona
 the Smithonia meteorite of Oglethorpe County, Georgia
 the Kenton County meteorite of Kenton County, Kentucky
 the Lombard meteorite of Broadwater County, Montana
 the Murphy meteorite of Cherokee County and the Lick Creek meteorite of Davidson County, North Carolina
 the New Baltimore meteorite of Somerset County, Pennsylvania

References

Meteorite minerals
Cubic minerals
Minerals in space group 225
Rocksalt group